Caerois is a Neotropical genus of butterflies from the family Nymphalidae.

Species
Arranged alphabetically:
 Caerois chorinaeus (Fabricius, 1775)
 Caerois gerdrudtus (Fabricius, 1793)

References

Morphinae
Nymphalidae of South America
Nymphalidae genera
Taxa named by Jacob Hübner